Jørgen Juul Jensen (born 17 November 1965) is a Danish former footballer who played as a midfielder. He made one appearances for the Denmark national team in 1990.

References

External links
 

1965 births
Living people
People from Rødovre
Danish men's footballers
Association football midfielders
Denmark international footballers
Danish Superliga players
Boldklubben 1903 players
F.C. Copenhagen players
Næstved Boldklub players
Lyngby Boldklub players
Sportspeople from the Capital Region of Denmark